The Komekurayama Solar Power Plant (米倉山太陽光発電所) is a 10 megawatt (MW) solar photovoltaic power station located at Mt. Komekura. It is the third solar plant built by Tepco, and was completed on January 27, 2012. In the first year of operation, it produced 14,434 MWh, which was about 20% greater than anticipated.

See also 

Ogishima Solar Power Plant
Ukishima Solar Power Plant
Solar power in Japan

References 

Photovoltaic power stations in Japan
Tokyo Electric Power Company
Energy infrastructure completed in 2012
2012 establishments in Japan